The UK R&B Chart is a weekly chart that ranks the 40 biggest-selling singles and albums that are classified in the R&B genre in the United Kingdom. The chart is compiled by the Official Charts Company, and is based on both physical and digital sales. 
This is a list of The Official UK Charts Company R&B hits of 2009.

Number ones

Notes
 – Was simultaneously number-one that week on the UK Singles Chart

Year-end statistics
 Best selling number one R&B single – "I Gotta Feeling" by Black Eyed Peas, sales of 848,000
 Best selling number one R&B artist – Black Eyed Peas, combined sales of 2,033,000
 Most weeks at number one (single, consecutive) – "Boom Boom Pow" by Black Eyed Peas, 7 weeks
 Most weeks at number one (single, non-consecutive) "I Gotta Feeling" by Black Eyed Peas, 4 weeks
 Most weeks at number one (artist, consecutive) – Black Eyed Peas, 7 weeks
 Most weeks at number one (artist, non-consecutive) – Black Eyed Peas, 14 weeks

See also
List of UK Singles Chart number ones of the 2000s
List of UK Dance Singles Chart number ones of 2009
List of UK Independent Singles Chart number ones of 2009
List of UK Singles Downloads Chart number ones of the 2000s
List of UK Rock & Metal Singles Chart number ones of 2009
List of UK R&B Albums Chart number ones of 2009

References

United Kingdom RandB Singles
2009
2009 in British music